Susan Walsh Longley (born December 15, 1955) is an American politician, lawyer, and jurist from Maine. A Democrat, Longley served in the Maine Senate from 1994 to 2002, where she represented Waldo County. In 2002, she sought the Democratic Party's nomination for Maine's 2nd congressional district, where she sought to replace John Baldacci. She lost in the June primary to Senate President Mike Michaud. In 2004, Longley unseated incumbent Republican Waldo Count Judge of Probate Randy Mailloux. She was re-elected in 2008, 2012 and 2016. She retired in 2019.

Personal & legal career
Longley, who was born in Lewiston, Maine and grew up near Bates College, is the daughter of former independent Governor James B. Longley. The Longley family is Irish Catholic and attended St. Patrick's Catholic Church in Lewiston. She graduated from Lewiston High School in 1974. She graduated from Mount Holyoke College (B.A., 1978), the Columbus School of Law (J.D., 1988) and the University of Maine (M.A., 1992). Upon her return to Maine in 1988, she was a law clerk for judges in Maine's Superior Court system. In addition to her having served as State Senator and Judge of Probate for Waldo County, Longley, a resident of Liberty, Maine, also has taught law and policy courses at Unity College for several years and, most recently, at the University of Maine.

References

1955 births
Living people
Politicians from Lewiston, Maine
People from Waldo County, Maine
Maine lawyers
Unity College (Maine) faculty
Democratic Party Maine state senators
Maine state court judges
Women state legislators in Maine
Mount Holyoke College alumni
Columbus School of Law alumni
University of Maine alumni
American people of Irish descent
Lewiston High School (Maine) alumni
American women academics
21st-century American women